"Say Amen (Saturday Night)" is a song by American pop rock band Panic! at the Disco from their sixth studio album, Pray for the Wicked (2018). It was released as the lead single for the album on March 21, 2018. The song became Panic! at the Disco's first number one single on the Billboard Alternative Songs chart in June 2018.

Release
"Say Amen (Saturday Night)" was released for digital download and streaming on March 21, 2018 and was produced by Jake Sinclair and Imad Royal. On the same day, the promotional single "(Fuck A) Silver Lining" was released. The song became Panic! at the Disco's first number one single on the Billboard Alternative Songs chart in June 2018.

Sound and lyrics
"Say Amen (Saturday Night)" is a pop rock song with influences of hip hop and electronica with a "dizzying swirl of synth-strings and pitch-shifted vocal samples." The track "features one of Urie’s strongest vocal performances to date. The song is known for Urie's famous A5 to B5 near the end.

Music video
Directed by Daniel "Cloud" Campos, the music video for "Say Amen (Saturday Night)" premiered on March 21, 2018. Panic! at the Disco frontman Brendon Urie confirmed that the music video serves as a prequel to the band's 2013 music video, "This Is Gospel", from the band's fourth studio album Too Weird to Live, Too Rare to Die! and the 2015 music video for "Emperor's New Clothes," from the band's fifth studio album Death of a Bachelor. 
The video begins with a news report explaining that an artifact has been stolen. It cuts to a mob of armed assassins breaking into Brendon Urie's home. Urie texts his girlfriend to delay her arrival, then defeats the burglars by various comical means, such as lassoing them into fans by the neck or driving knives into their faces. Urie's girlfriend then arrives, whereupon they hug their way to the bedroom. When she notices the artifact hanging on Urie's chest by a necklace, she beats him and then kills him with a bat. She steals the key from Urie's body as heartbeats reminiscing "This Is Gospel" are heard.

Track listing

Charts

Weekly charts

Year-end charts

Certifications

References

2018 singles
Panic! at the Disco songs
Songs critical of religion
Songs written by Jake Sinclair (musician)
Songs written by Lolo (singer)
Songs written by Brendon Urie
Songs written by Sam Hollander
2018 songs
Fueled by Ramen singles
Songs about nights